The Castle Building is an office building in Montreal, Quebec, Canada. Its address is 1410 Stanley Street on the corner of Saint Catherine Street West in Downtown Montreal. It is owned by  Gold Castle Holdings Limited. The building is now home to a Victoria's Secret outlet and was previously home to a Chapters bookstore, which closed in 2014.

Named for the Castle Tea Company and erected on the site of the former Emmanuel Congregational Church, it was designed by Montreal architecture firm Ross and Macdonald, and was completed in 1927. It has 11 floors. The building's facade material is brick and its facade system is applied masonry. Its architectural style is Neoclassical.

Tenants include postproduction company SHED and digital agency TP1.

The Castle Building was awarded the Heritage Emeritus Award in 2005 by the City of Montreal and Heritage Montreal.

References

External links
Castle Building - Gold Castle Holdings
TP1 moves into the Castle Building

Office buildings in Montreal
Downtown Montreal
Neoclassical architecture in Canada
Office buildings completed in 1927
Ross and Macdonald buildings
1927 establishments in Quebec